Pelochyta is a genus of moths in the family Erebidae. The species was first described by Jacob Hübner in 1819. They are found in Africa, as well as throughout India, Myanmar, Sri Lanka, Australia, and New Britain.

Description
Its palpi are correctly upturned and slender. Its antennae are nearly simple. The forewing has an arched costa. The outer margin is obliquely curved. Veins 3 to 5 from angle of cell. Vein 6 from below upper angle. Veins 7 to 9 are stalked. Vein 10 from cell. Hindwings have an anal angle. Its outer margin is nearly straight. Its apex is slightly acute.

Species

Pelochyta acuta Toulgoët, 1984
Pelochyta adumbrata Dognin, 1922
Pelochyta affinis Rothschild, 1909
Pelochyta albipars (Hampson, 1914)
Pelochyta albotestaceus (Rothschild, 1909)
Pelochyta aliena (Maassen, 1890)
Pelochyta arenacea (Schaus, 1901)
Pelochyta arontes (Stoll, [1782])
Pelochyta atra Rothschild, 1909
Pelochyta bicolor Rothschild, 1909
Pelochyta brunnescens Rothschild, 1909
Pelochyta cervina (H. Edwards, 1884)
Pelochyta cinerea (Walker, 1855)
Pelochyta colombiana (Rothschild, 1916)
Pelochyta dorsicincta Hampson, 1916
Pelochyta draudti (Seitz, 1922)
Pelochyta fassli Rothschild, 1911
Pelochyta fergusoni Watson & Goodger, 1986
Pelochyta gandolfii Schaus, 1933
Pelochyta haemapleura Dognin, 1914
Pelochyta joseensis Strand, 1921
Pelochyta misera Schaus, 1911
Pelochyta nigrescens (Dognin, 1891)
Pelochyta pallida (Schaus, 1901)
Pelochyta propinqua Toulgoët, 1984
Pelochyta ruficollis (Druce, 1884)
Pelochyta semivitrea (Dognin, 1907)
Pelochyta songoa Schaus, 1933
Pelochyta spitzi Rothschild, 1933
Pelochyta umbrata Hampson, 1901

Former species
Pelochyta nabor Schaus, 1924

References
Notes

Bibliography

 
Phaegopterina
Moth genera